Ioannis Spanoudakis (alternate spellings: Giannis, Yiannis, Yannis) (1930 – 10 June 2010), was a Greek basketball player and coach. He represented the Greece men's  national basketball team. Along with his brother, Alekos, he is considered to be one of the early leading pioneers of the sport of modern basketball in the country of Greece. He was the long-time player / head coach of the Greek Basket League club Olympiacos, acting simultaneously in both roles, while with the club.

Club career
Spanoudakis played basketball at the club level with the Greek Basket League team Olympiacos. While with Olympiacos in the 1950s, Spanoudakis trained with Bob Cousy and Greek-American Lou Tsioropoulos, of the NBA's Boston Celtics, in Greece. Spanoudakis, and his brother, Alekos, learned the American style of basketball from the two Celtics players, and they were the first two athletes to bring American basketball techniques to Greece.

He also played in the Italian LBA League, with Virtus Bologna and Motomorini Bologna.

National team career
Spanoudakis was a member of the Greek men's national basketball team. With Greece, he played at the 1951 EuroBasket, and at the 1952 Summer Olympic Games. He also played at the 1960 Pre-Olympic Tournament.

Coaching career
Spanoudakis was the head coach of the Greek Basket League club Olympiacos.

References

External links
Ioannis Spanoudakis at fiba.com (EuroBasket Profile)
Ioannis Spanoudakis at fiba.com (Olympics Profile)
Ioannis Spanoudakis at Sports-reference.com
Ioannis Spanoudakis at basket.gr 

1930 births
2010 deaths
Basketball players at the 1952 Summer Olympics
Basketball players at the 1955 Mediterranean Games
Greek basketball coaches
Greek Basket League players
Greek men's basketball players
Mediterranean Games bronze medalists for Greece
Olympiacos B.C. coaches
Olympiacos B.C. players
Olympic basketball players of Greece
Virtus Bologna players
Mediterranean Games medalists in basketball
Basketball players from Chania